The discography of Glasvegas, a Scottish Indie rock band, consists of four studio albums and eighteen singles. James Allan (vocals and guitar), Rab Allan (guitar), Paul Donoghue (bass) and Jonna Lofgren (drums) formed the band in Glasgow, Scotland in 2003. The band's debut single was the limited edition double A-side single, "I'm Gonna Get Stabbed"/"Ina Lvs Rab", which was released in May 2004. Three further independent singles were released through WaKS and Sane Man, all of which failed to chart. Despite this, "Daddy's Gone", released on Sane Man Recordings, was voted the No.2 single of the year by the NME.

The band signed with Columbia Records in early 2008 and released two further singles – "Geraldine" and "Daddy's Gone" (a re-release of their third single) – which reached numbers sixteen and twelve on the UK Singles Chart respectively. The band's debut album, Glasvegas, was released in September 2008 and reached number 1 on the UK Albums Chart. A mini-Christmas album, A Snowflake Fell (And It Felt Like a Kiss), followed in December 2008, which failed to chart in the UK although it reached number fifty-nine on the Swedish Albums Chart. Euphoric Heartbreak was released on 4 April 2011 and reached No.10 in the UK charts and No.1 in Sweden. The third studio album was released on 2 September 2013. The band's fourth album Godspeed is due to be released in April 2021, with the lead single "Keep Me a Space" released in August 2020.

Studio albums

Extended plays

Singles

Music videos

Other charted songs
With the A Snowflake Fell (And It Felt Like a Kiss) mini-album being released solely as a bonus CD for the special edition re-release of Glasvegas in the UK, fans who had already bought the album prior to this release had the option to download the EP, resulting in each track charting on the UK Singles Chart.

References

External links
Official website

Discographies of British artists
Rock music group discographies